The Edward Jenner Medal is awarded occasionally by the Royal Society of Medicine to individuals who have undertaken distinguished work in epidemiological research.

The award was founded in 1896 by the Epidemiological Society of London (1850–1907) to commemorate the centenary of Edward Jenner’s discovery of a means of smallpox vaccination. The Epidemiological Society became a founder member of the Royal Society of Medicine in 1907.

The medal was designed in Bronze by Allan Wyon. It features Jenner’s face on one aspect and the symbol of the Epidemiological Society, the Earth, on the reverse. The medal was re-cast following the evolution of the Society into the Section of Epidemiology at the RSM in 1907.  Photographs of the medal may be found in The History of the Royal Society of Medicine  published in 2001.

It was first awarded to Sir William Henry Power who was the then Medical Officer for London and had formulated the theory of aerial conveyance of smallpox and chaired the Royal Commission on Tuberculosis.

Recipients include:
 William Henry Power (1st recipient-1898)
 Charles Louis Alphonse Laveran (2nd-1902) for his discovery of the malarial parasite
 Patrick Manson (3rd-1912):
 Sir  (4th-1921) 
  (5th-1922) 
 Sidney Monckton Copeman (?th-1925)
 Thomas Henry Craig Stevenson (before 1933, see ref)
 Sir  (?th-1934) for distinguished work in epidemiology.
 Arthur Newsholme (?th-1938)
 Alexander Thomas Glenny (?th-1953) for contributions to diphtheria immunisation
  (?th-1956) 
 Leonard Colebrook (?th-1962)
 Alexander D Langmuir (17th-1979)
 Richard Doll (18th-1981): for outstanding studies on the epidemiology of cancer
 Karel Raška (19th-1984): for work towards worldwide eradication of smallpox
  (21st-before 1991)
 Donald Acheson (?th-1993): for the advancement of public health
 Donald Henderson (?th-1996): for work towards worldwide eradication of smallpox 
 Dame Rosemary Rue (?th-2001): first woman president of the Faculty of Community Medicine (now the Faculty of Public Health) and pioneer of women in medicine

See also

 List of medicine awards
 List of awards named after people

References

British science and technology awards
Medicine awards
Awards established in 1896
Royal Society of Medicine